Greece competed at the 1998 Winter Olympics in Nagano, Japan.

Alpine skiing

Men

Women

Biathlon

Men

 1 A penalty loop of 150 metres had to be skied per missed target.
 2 One minute added per missed target.

Bobsleigh

Cross-country skiing

Men

 C = Classical style, F = Freestyle

Women

 C = Classical style, F = Freestyle

Luge

Men

Snowboarding

Men's giant slalom

Women's giant slalom

References
Official Olympic Reports
 Olympic Winter Games 1998, full results by sports-reference.com

Nations at the 1998 Winter Olympics
1998
Olympics